Our Fighting Navy (also known as Torpedoed) is a 1937 British action film directed by Norman Walker and starring Robert Douglas, Richard Cromwell and Hazel Terry. The screenplay concerns a British warship that intervenes to protect British subjects and prevent a rebellion in a South American republic. The Royal Navy, viewing the film as a recruitment opportunity, provided warships and extras.

The film was made by Herbert Wilcox Productions made at Pinewood Studios. The film's sets were designed by the art director Lawrence P. Williams. It was given an American release in 1938 with a reduced running time. The dialogue adaptation for the French dub version was carried out by Jean Devaivre and the film was released in France under the title  in 1938.

Cast
 Robert Douglas as Captain Markham 
 Richard Cromwell as Lieutenant Bill Armstrong 
 Hazel Terry as Pamela Brent 
 H.B. Warner as Brent, British Consul 
 Noah Beery as Presidente of Bianco 
 Esme Percy as Diego de Costa 
 Frederick Culley as Admiral 
 Henry Victor as Lieutenant d'Enriquo 
 Binkie Stuart as Jennifer 
 Julie Suedo as Juanita 
 Richard Ainley as Lieutenant (uncredited)

Notes

References

Bibliography
 Low, Rachael. Filmmaking in 1930s Britain. George Allen & Unwin, 1985.
 Wood, Linda. British Films, 1927-1939. British Film Institute, 1986.

External links

1937 films
1930s action films
British action films
1930s English-language films
Films directed by Norman Walker
Films set in South America
Films about naval warfare
Films shot at Pinewood Studios
British black-and-white films
1930s British films